The Petroleum Warfare Department (PWD) was a government department established in Britain in 1940 in response to the invasion crisis during World War II, when  Germany apparently would invade the country. The department was initially tasked with developing the uses of petroleum as a weapon of war, and it oversaw the introduction of a wide range of flame warfare weapons. Later in the war, the department was instrumental in the creation of the Fog Investigation and Dispersal Operation (commonly known as FIDO) that cleared runways of fog allowing the landing of aircraft returning from bombing raids over Germany in poor visibility, and Operation Pluto, which installed prefabricated fuel pipelines between England and France soon after the Allied invasion of Normandy in June 1944.

Inception 

At the beginning of World War II, in September 1939, little fighting occurred in the West until the German invasion of France and the Low Countries in May 1940. Following the fall of France and the withdrawal of the British Expeditionary Force (BEF) from the beaches at Dunkirk in June 1940, Britain was threatened with invasion by German armed forces in 1940 and 1941.

In response to this threat of invasion, the British sought to expand the Royal Navy, Royal Air Force, and Army, replace the equipment that had been left behind at Dunkirk, and supplement the regular armed services with volunteer organisations such as the part-time soldiers in the Home Guard. With many types of equipment in short supply, frantic efforts were made to develop new weapons – particularly those that did not require scarce materials.

Although oil imports from the Middle East had stopped and most oil for Britain came from the United States, no shortage of oil existed at the time; supplies originally intended for Europe were filling British storage facilities and full tankers were kept waiting in American ports. The amount of petrol allocated for civilian use was strictly rationed and pleasure motoring was strongly discouraged. This was not, at least initially, because of a shortage of petrol, but because it might lead to large congregations of well-fuelled vehicles at popular places.

In the event of an invasion, the British would be faced with the problem of destroying these stocks lest they should prove of use to the enemy (as they had in France). By mid-June, as a basic anti-invasion precaution, wayside petrol stations near the coast had been emptied, or at least had their pumps disabled, and garages everywhere were required to have a plan to prevent their stocks being of use to the invader.

On 29 May 1940, as the evacuation of the BEF was in progress, Maurice Hankey, then a cabinet minister without portfolio, joined the Ministerial Committee on Civil Defence (CDC) chaired by Sir John Anderson, the Secretary of State for the Home Office and Home Security. Among many ideas, Hankey "brought out of his stable a hobby horse, which he had ridden very hard in the 1914–18 war – namely the use of burning oil for defensive purposes." Hankey believed that oil should not just be denied to an invader, but used to impede him. Towards the end of June, Hankey brought his scheme up at a meeting of the Oil Control Board and produced for Commander-in-Chief Home Forces Edmund Ironside extracts of his paper on experiments with oil in the First World War. On 5 June, Churchill authorised Geoffrey Lloyd, the Secretary for Petroleum, to press ahead with experiments, with Hankey taking the matter under his general supervision.

Donald Banks 
Donald Banks had served with distinction in World War I, winning the Distinguished Service Order and Military Cross. He joined the civil service, and in 1934, he was made Director-General of the Post Office, he then moved to the Air Ministry and served there as Permanent Under Secretary from 1936 to 1938. Due to overwork, Banks was given lighter duties, including a mission to Australia to advise on aircraft production and a job at the Import Duties Advisory Committee. During this period, Banks was in the Territorial Army Reserve. When hostilities broke out in September 1939, the advisory committee was abolished and he was free to serve in the armed forces.

Banks was soon posted as air attaché to the quartermaster general of 50th (Northumbrian) Infantry Division – a first-line division of the Territorial Army. Banks got on well with his commander, Major-general Giffard LeQuesne Martel. Banks admired his leadership and his enthusiasm for experimentation and improvisation. In October 1939, the division was sent to the Cotswolds, and in January 1940, it was moved to France.

When Germany attacked in May, the division was heavily involved in the fighting around Arras and was later withdrawn to the coast. Banks later recalled looking out to sea from a clifftop and seeing "an awe-inspiring sight [...] A few miles away an oil tanker had been bombed or had struck a mine. Masses of the blackest smoke pillared up into a gigantic pall in the sky while in the vast lake of fire, spreading it seemed for miles on the water a flame blazed and leapt like an angry volcano [...] I was often to recall that scene in subsequent days of Flame Warfare". The division was evacuated to England.

Early in July 1940, Banks was summoned to the presence of Geoffrey Lloyd, who explained the vision that Hankey and he shared: "Flame all across Britain" he said, "ringing the coasts, spurting from the hedges and rolling down the hills. We will burn the invader back into the sea."

Considering Lloyd's ideas over the next few days and consulting with other soldiers, Banks found both professional scepticism and enthusiasm. Banks, a man who said he preferred the prospect of real fighting over "Whitehall warfare", was not himself keen and his first instinct was to suggest that petroleum weapons should be developed locally. Lloyd would have none of it and Banks was ordered to report to him for special duties. On 9 July, cutting through red tape, the Petroleum Warfare Department was created.

The Petroleum Warfare Department started on 9 July 1940 in three small rooms. They were independently administered and financed with a few staff entirely lacking in technical knowledge.

Flame traps 

PWD took inspiration from events that happened during the retreat to Dunkirk in June 1940. One example occurred when Boulogne was attacked in the early hours of 23 May and the road to Calais was cut. In the defence of Boulogne, a group of pioneers under Lieutenant-colonel Donald Dean , had improvised a road block made of vehicles and piles of furniture from bombed-out houses. An approaching tank began to push its way over the obstruction, as Dean wrote:

The newly formed department quickly made arrangements for some practical experiments at Dumpton Gap in Kent. These were the source of some excitement for witnesses, who included the pilots of enemy planes. Many of the first ideas to be tried proved fruitless, but experience quickly led to the development of the first practical weapon - the static flame trap.

Static flame trap 

A static flame trap allowed a length of road, typically , to be covered in flame and smoke at a moment's notice. The weapon was a simple arrangement of perforated pipes placed alongside a road. The pipes were steel,  in diameter and drilled with  holes at angles carefully calculated to cover the road evenly. The perforated pipes were connected to larger pipes that led to a tank of fuel in a raised position. The fuel mixture was 25% petrol and 75% gas-oil that was contrived to be of no use as motor vehicle fuel should it be captured. All that was required to trigger the weapon was to open a valve and for a Home Guard to throw in a Molotov cocktail creating an inferno. The ideal location for the trap was a place where vehicles could not easily escape, such as a steep-sided sunken road. Some trouble was taken with camouflage; pipes could be hidden in gutters or disguised as handrails; others were simply left as innocent-looking plumbing.

All the required pipes and valves could be obtained from the gas and water industries with little modification required beyond drilling a few holes. In general, gravity was all that was required to provide sufficient pressure for the fountains of oil but, where necessary, pumps were provided.

Later versions were a little more sophisticated; remote ignition could be achieved in a variety of ways. In one system, called the Birch Igniter, the pressure of the oil at the end of the pipe would squeeze glycerine from a rubber bulb; the glycerine would fall onto a container of potassium permanganate, which would then ignite spontaneously. Another method was to run a pair of small rubber tubes, down one of which would be passed acetylene and the other chlorine; when, at the far end, these two gases were allowed to mix, there would be a spontaneous ignition. This system had the advantage that it could be turned on and off repeatedly. The development of the flame fougasse (see below) provided a method of remote electrical ignition that could only be used once, but was virtually instantaneous.

Some 200 static flame traps were installed, mainly by the employees of oil companies whose services were placed at the disposal of the government.

Mobile flame traps 

In addition to the static flame traps, mobile units were created. The main design used an otherwise redundant  tank mounted on the back of a 30 cwt lorry, just behind the cabin. In the middle of the remaining space was a petrol-driven pump and either side of this was stored  of armoured rubber hose. Two nozzles were provided with a primitive sight and with spikes for pushing into the ground. Gas tubes for chlorine and acetylene gas were provided for ignition.

Because a shortage of pumps existed – they were badly needed for fighting fires started by bombing – a simpler type of mobile flame trap was also designed. Five of these cylinders could be transported on the back of a vehicle, and at a weight just under , could be deployed reasonably quickly wherever an ambush was required. The cylinders would be placed at intervals along a road, each with a short length of hose leading to a nozzle secured by ground spikes. Flow was initiated by a pull string that opened a valve and ignition was provided by Molotov cocktails.

Flame fougasse 

The Petroleum Warfare Department soon received the assistance of Henry Newton and William Howard Livens, both known for designing mortars during the First World War.

During the First World War, Livens had developed a number of chemical-warfare and flame-throwing weapons. The largest of his works was the Livens large-gallery flame projector, which could project burning fuel . The great advantage of the Livens projector was that it was cheap; this allowed hundreds, and on occasions thousands, to be set up and then fired simultaneously, catching the enemy by surprise. Both Livens and Newton experimented with field-expedient versions of the Livens projector using commercially available five-gallon drums and tubes. Newton experimented with firing milk bottles filled with phosphorus using a rifle. None of these experiments were taken forward.

However, one of Livens' PWD demonstrations, probably first seen about mid-July at Dumpton Gap, was more promising. A barrel of oil was simply blown up on the beach; Lloyd was said to have been particularly impressed when he observed a party of high-ranking officers witnessing a test from the top of a cliff making "an instantaneous and precipitate movement to the rear". The work was dangerous. Livens and Banks were experimenting with five-gallon drums in the shingle at Hythe when a short circuit triggered several weapons. By good fortune, the battery of drums where the party was standing failed to go off.

The experiments led to a particularly promising arrangement - a 40-gallon steel drum buried in an earthen bank with just the round front end exposed. The design was reminiscent of a weapon dating from late medieval times called a fougasse - a hollow in which was placed a barrel of gunpowder covered by rocks, the explosives to be detonated by a fuse at an opportune moment. Livens' new weapon was duly dubbed the flame fougasse. The flame fougasse was demonstrated to Clement Attlee (Lord Privy Seal), Maurice Hankey, and General Liardet (GOC 56th Division) on 20 July 1940.

A variant of the flame fougasse called the "demi-gass" was a fougasse barrel placed horizontally in the open with an explosive charge underneath that would rupture the barrel and flip it over towards the target. Another variant was the "hedge hopper", a fougasse barrel on its end with an explosive charge underneath that would send it bounding over a hedge or wall; this made the hedge hopper particularly easy to conceal. A further variant of the hedge hopper idea was devised for St Margaret's Bay, where the barrels would be sent rolling over the cliff edge.

In all, some 50,000 flame fougasse barrels were distributed, of which the great majority were installed in one of 7,000 batteries mostly in southern England and a little later at 2,000 sites in Scotland. Some barrels were held in reserve, while others were deployed at storage sites to destroy fuel depots at short notice. The size of a battery varied from just one drum to as many as 14; a four-barrel battery was the most common installation and the recommended minimum. Where possible, half the barrels in a battery were to contain the 40/60 mixture and half the sticky 5B mixture.

Troubled waters

Operation Lucid 

A series of experiments investigated the possibility of burning the invader's barges before they could reach the English shore. The first idea was simply to explode a vessel filled with oil, and this was tried at Maplin Sands, where a Thames oil tanker, Suffolk, with 50 tonnes of petroleum, was blown up in shallow water. Another idea developed was that the oil should be held in place on the water by a trough formed from coir matting. A machine formed the trough from a flat mat as it was paid out over the stern of a ship. Trials with the Ben Hann produced a flaming ribbon 880 yards long and 6 feet wide (800 m × 2 m) that could be towed at four knots. Neither of these experiments were carried forward to produce workable defences.

The Suffolk did, however, provide a trial run for an even more ambitious idea - the invasion barges would be burned even before they left port. The plan was first floated in early June/July 1940 and became known as Operation Lucid.

Three old tankers were quickly prepared as fire ships for the operation under the command of Augustus Agar VC with Morgan Morgan-Giles as his staff officer. Each ship was laden with over 2,000 tons of flammable oils and a miscellany of leftover explosive devices. Although the operation was started several times in September–October 1940, the attempts were thwarted by bad weather, unreliable ships, and finally, one of the destroyers in the group was damaged by a mine. By November, any invasion plan had been called off and Lucid was shelved.

Burning seas 

From its earliest days, the PWD experimented with "setting the sea on fire" by burning oil that was floating on the surface. It was immediately appreciated that the possibilities of such a weapon lay not only in its ability to destroy the enemy, but also in the propaganda value of the terror of fire.

In 1938, an Enemy Publicity Section, created for propaganda to be sent to the enemy, was formed by Hankey and a new section was formed under Sir Campbell Stuart, who was a former editor of The Times newspaper. Being allocated premises at Electra House, the new section was dubbed Department EH. During the Munich crisis of 1938, a number of leaflets were printed with the intention of dropping them over Germany. The leaflet drop never took place, but the exercise prompted Department EH to issue a note to the Air Ministry insisting on the importance of a properly coordinated system for sending information to enemy countries. The Permanent Secretary (most senior civil servant of a department) at the Air Ministry to whom the note was addressed was Sir Donald Banks, who would later head the PWD.

On 25 September 1939, Department EH was mobilised to Woburn Abbey where it joined another subversion team known as Section D that had been formed by Major Laurence Grand.

In July 1940, Prime Minister Winston Churchill invited Hugh Dalton to take charge of the newly formed Special Operations Executive (SOE). The mission of the SOE was to encourage and facilitate espionage and sabotage behind enemy lines, or as Churchill put, it: to "set Europe ablaze". Among those present at the first summit meeting of SOE on 1 July 1940 were Lord Hankey, Geoffrey Lloyd and Desmond Morton – people who would be instrumental in the formation of the PWD just a few days later.

Department EH and section D later became SO1 and SO2 of the SOE. Subsequently, in September 1941, responsibilities for political warfare was taken away from the SOE with the formation of the Political Warfare Executive.

Although PWD would go on to work on burning floating oil, a plan was hatched to spread the story that such a weapon already existed even before the first trials were performed. Writer James Hayward has made an extensive study of this curious story; in The Bodies on the Beach, Hayward makes a compelling case for the view that the burning seas work was driven substantially by the needs of propaganda and was a sophisticated bluff that became Britain's first major propaganda success of the war. Writing just after the war, Banks said, "Perhaps the greatest contribution from all these variegated efforts was in building up the great propaganda story of the Flame Defence of Britain which swept the Continent of Europe in 1940."

The details of the story indicated the invention of a bomb that would spread a thin film of volatile liquid on the surface of the water and then ignite it. This rumour was whispered into attentive ears in neutral cities such as Stockholm, Lisbon, Madrid, Cairo, Istanbul, Ankara, New York, and other places, probably around late July or early August 1940. The burning-seas rumour appealed to the dark imaginations of both friend and foe. Soon, interrogation of captured Luftwaffe pilots revealed that the rumour had become common knowledge.

German armed forces began experimenting with burning floating oil. On 18 August, they ignited 100 tons of floating oil; it burned for 20 minutes producing heat and copious smoke – this was almost a week before the first successful British ignition.

In Europe, the burning-seas story became embellished to the point where the story included a German invasion attempt thwarted by the ignition of oil on water. American war correspondent William Lawrence Shirer was based in Berlin at the time, but in mid-September, he visited Geneva, Switzerland.

On the evening of the following day, Shirer arrived back in Berlin:

The following day, Shirer heard about further train loads of wounded soldiers. A plausible explanation for these wounded is that they were hurt in RAF bombing raids on ports of embarkation. Such raids were certainly going on, though it seems they were generally fairly ineffective and no records of significant German casualties have been turned up. It seems likely that the rumour machine inflated light casualties to proportions of strategic consequence.

The British were getting better organised. A system was set up to collect suggestions for Inspired Rumours; these suggestions, which became known as SIBS (from the Latin sibilare, to hiss). SIBS, were sifted through at weekly meetings in order that they should present a consistent message and to ensure that ludicrously improbable and inadvertently true rumours were filtered out. New SIBS included "small scale attempts at invasion have been made and have been beaten off with devastating losses. In fact none are alive to tell. Thousands of floating German corpses have been washed ashore." and "The fishing populations of the west coast of Denmark and the south coast of Norway are selling fish but they won't eat them. The reason is that there are numbers of German corpses on which the fish feed. There have even been cases of shreds of clothing and buttons, etc. being found inside the fish."

The story of the burning seas was further reinforced. In October, the RAF dropped leaflets containing handy phrases for visitors to the United Kingdom in German, French, and Dutch. The phrases included "the sea smells of petrol here", "the sea even burns here", "see how well the captain burns", "Karl/Willi/Fritz/Johann/Abraham: cremated/drowned/minced by the propellers!" As Hayward explains, these leaflets were simply building on and reinforcing the rumours of a failed invasion attempt that were being disseminated around the world from late September. The original propaganda was conflated with other events both real and imaginary and the rumours spread. Of course, the German command knew that the stories were untrue; the real targets of the propaganda were the men who might actually be asked to attempt a landing in England. Berlin felt forced officially to deny the rumours:

Inevitably, the story made its way back to the UK. Publication of the contents of propaganda leaflets dropped by the RAF was not permitted and other stories such as an official statement from the Free French Information Service through the Ministry of Information saying that "30,000 Germans drowning in an attempted embarkation last September" were suppressed. Vivid and plausible accounts of a thwarted invasion were published in American newspapers and the rumours spread in Britain and proved persistent. Questions were even asked in parliament. Writing just after the war, the Chief Press Censor, Rear Admiral George Pirie Thomson said that "... in the whole course of the war there was no story which gave me so much trouble as this one of the attempted German invasion, flaming oil on the water and 30,000 burned Germans."

On 7 September 1940, the Battle of Britain was still raging, but the German Air Force changed its tactics and started to bomb London. With the accumulation of invasion barges and favourable tides, the authorities were convinced that invasion was imminent, the codeword Cromwell was passed to the Army and Home Forces. The codeword was only meant to indicate "invasion imminent", but with a nation tense with expectation and some Home Guardsmen incompletely briefed, some believed that the invasion had started and this caused great confusion. In some areas, church bells were rung on receipt of the codeword even though this was only supposed to happen when invaders were in the immediate area. Roadblocks were set up, some bridges blown, and land mines sown on some roads (killing three Guards officers). Home Guard units searched beaches for invasion barges and scanned the skies for approaching German paratroopers, but none came. Public recollection of these events did much to reinforce the idea that some kind of landing had, in fact, been attempted.

The burning sea lie provided the British with their first major black propaganda victory. The compelling story is likely to be the basis of a number of invasion myths that remained in circulation throughout the remainder of the 20th century, that the Germans attempted an invasion which was thwarted by the use of sea-burning bombs. The most persistent of these stories becoming known as the Shingle Street Mystery named after an isolated village on the Suffolk coast.

Flame barrage 

Propaganda aside, the efforts of the PWD were real enough; they continued with experiments to actually set the sea on fire. Although initial tests were discouraging, Geoffrey Lloyd was reluctant to let the matter go. On 24 August 1940, on the northern shores of the Solent, near Titchfield, 10 tanker wagons began to pump oil down pipes running from the top of a 30-foot-high (10 m) cliff down into the water at the rate of about 12 tons/hour. In front of many spectators, the oil was ignited by flares and a system of sodium and petrol pellets. In a matter of seconds, a raging wall of flame was produced; the intense heat caused the water to boil and people at the cliff edge were obliged to retreat. The demonstration was very dramatic, but it was not an unqualified success because the circumstances were improbably favourable; in the sheltered waters of the Solent, the sun-warmed sea was calm and the winds light. A lengthy series of experiments continued with many reverses; in one case, the pipes attached to "Admiralty scaffolding"' (an antitank barrier of scaffolding placed in the shallows) were torn up in a storm and in another incident sappers were blown up by beach mines. It was found that effectiveness was very much affected by sea conditions; a low temperature made ignition more difficult and waves would quickly break up the oil into small ineffectual slicks.

On 20 December 1940, Generals Harold Alexander and Bernard Montgomery and many other senior officers gathered for a demonstration. The performance was completely unconvincing with just a few small pools of burning oil battered by the surf. The cold, cloudy weather matched the mood of pessimism; Banks describes this day as the Black Friday in the annals of the PWD.

General Alexander was sympathetic to the PWD's problems, and suggested that the pipes be moved to a point immediately above the high tide point and, after several months of further work, this proved to be the solution – oil sprayed and burnt over rather than on the water. On 24 February 1941, the Chiefs of Staff committee, that included General Brooke, watched films of the recent experiments and approved the installation of 50 miles of flame barrage - 25 miles on the south-eastern coast, 15 miles on the eastern, and 10 miles on the southern commands.

Although Geoffrey Lloyd, Secretary for Petroleum, was enthusiastic, General Brooke was, on reflection, not convinced of its efficacy. Brooke's main objections were that the weapon was dependent upon favourable winds, it created a smokescreen that might favour the enemy, and it was very vulnerable to bombing and shell fire; in any case, it was of short duration. The required resources were considerable and a serious shortage of materials existed; lack of support from authorities and the competing demands for supplies meant that the plans were cut back to thirty miles of barrage, then fifteen and then less than ten miles. According to Banks: "Lengths of this flame defence ultimately were completed at Deal between Kingsdown and Sandwich, at St. Margaret's Bay, at Shakespeare Cliff near Dover railway tunnel, at Rye where a remarkable system of remote control across the marshes was installed, and at Studland Bay. In South Wales long stretches were put in hand at the time when the airborne threat to Ireland was looming large, and sections at Wick and Thurso, but these were not brought to completion. In Cornwall at Porthcurno, where the important transatlantic cables came ashore, a gravity fed section was put in as a security measure against raids."

Portable flamethrowers 
During World War I, the British had developed flamethrowers. Banks had seen the Livens large-gallery flame projector used at the Somme in July 1916 and a large-scale flamethrower had been installed on HMS Vindictive and used in the raid on Zeebrugge. Portable flame-throwing apparatus was also designed, but the war ended before it could be fully employed; further development ceased and records of the work were lost.

Work restarted in 1939 at the newly formed Ministry of Supply Research Department at Woolwich, and many of the basic technical problems were investigated such as the design of valves and nozzles, the problem of ignition, and of fuels and propellants. Independently, Commander Marsden was working on portable flamethrowers for the Army. His work eventually resulted in the semiportable "Harvey" flamethrower and the backpack "Marsden" flamethrower. Meanwhile, the PWD developed the Home Guard flamethrower as a quickly extemporised weapon.

Home Guard flamethrower 
The so-called Home Guard flamethrower was not a flamethrower in the conventional sense, but a small, semimobile flame trap.

From about September 1940, 300 Home Guard units received a kit of parts provided by the PWD - a  barrel,  of hose, a hand pump, some connective plumbing, and a set of do-it-yourself instructions. The barrel was set upon an  hand cart that was made locally from four-by-two-inch timber and mounted on a pair of wheels salvaged from a car axle. The nozzle and ground spike were of simple construction from sections of three-quarter-inch-diameter gas pipe with a used food can over the end to catch drips of fuel that would maintain a flame when the pressure was allowed to drop. When completed, the weapon was filled with a 40/60 mixture obtained locally.

The Home Guard flamethrower was light enough to be wheeled along roads and possibly over fields to where it was needed by its crew of five or six men. It would be used as part of an ambush in combination with Molotov cocktails and whatever other weapons were available.

Harvey flamethrower 

The Harvey flamethrower was introduced in August 1940, and was mostly made from readily available parts such as wheels from agricultural equipment manufacturers and commercially available compressed air cylinders. It comprised a welded-steel cylinder containing 22 gallons (100 L) of creosote and a standard bottle of compressed nitrogen at  mounted on a sack truck of the type that a railway-station porter might use. About  of armoured hose provided the connection to a  lance with a nozzle and some paraffin-soaked cotton waste that was set alight to provide a source of ignition. Like the Home Guard flamethrower, it was intended as an ambush weapon, but in this case the operator was able to direct the flames by moving the lance which would be pushed through a hole in otherwise bulletproof cover such as a brick wall.

Marsden flamethrower 
The weapon could give 12 seconds of flame divided into any number of individual spurts. The Marsden flamethrower was heavy and cumbersome; 1500 were made but few were issued.

Neither the Harvey nor the Marsden was popular with the Army; both ended up with the Home Guard. The Marsden was superseded in 1943 by the Flamethrower, Portable, No 2 which became known as the "lifebuoy" flamethrower from the ring shape of the fuel tank.

Vehicle-mounted flamethrowers

Cockatrice 

The PWD brought together and supervised a number of otherwise independent developments of vehicle-mounted flamethrowers. The first product of this work was a prototype of Cockatrice that was demonstrated in August 1940. Reginald Fraser of Imperial College, London University, who was also a director of the Lagonda car company, developed an annular flamethrower, that threw petrol with an outer layer of thickened fuel. He thought that this would reduce the risk of fire working backwards to the fuel tank because oxygen would not be present. With the encouragement of the PWD, Fraser produced and demonstrated a prototype at Snoddington Furze in August 1940. Fraser went on to have an experimental vehicle put together by Lagonda on a Commer lorry chassis. A demonstration of the Lagonda vehicle at PWD's test site at Moody Down farm near Winchester was attended by Nevil Shute Norway and Lieutenant Jack Cooke of the Admiralty Directorate of Miscellaneous Weapons Development. Norway later recalled, "It was a terrifying apparatus ... [It] fired a mixture of diesel oil and tar and had a range of about 100 yards. It had a flame 30 feet in diameter and used 8 gallons of fuel a second ... When demonstrated to admirals and generals, it usually appalled and horrified them ..."

Norway understood that invading airborne troops landing at an airfield would need about one minute after touchdown while they prepared their equipment, in which time they would be extremely vulnerable; a flamethrower on a vehicle that could be driven at speed could envelop the enemy in fire before the vehicle itself was destroyed. Cooke worked on the problem and the result was "Cockatrice". The Light Cockatrices variant was based on an armoured Bedford QL vehicle with flame–projector; sixty of these were ordered for the protection of Royal Naval Air Stations. The Heavy Cockatrice was based on the larger AEC Matador 6×6 chassis already in RAF service as a fuel bowser; six of these were constructed for RAF airfield defence. Other than having a larger fuel tank, the Heavy Cockatrice was the same vehicle. The Army showed little interest in Cockatrice, and it never went into mass production.

The flamethrower from Cockatrice was also deployed on a number of small ships. German pilots were in the habit of attacking coastal vessels, flying in very low hoping to avoid detection and dropping their bombs before flying over the ship at mast height. Norway thought that a vertical flamethrower might discourage such attacks. An experiment with a Cockatrice-like flamethrower on board La Patrie, the flame's length was increased by the up-draft of the heat generated so that the pillar of fire reached  vertically. A pilot was found to make dummy attacks, flying closer and closer with each pass he eventually had his wingtip virtually in the flame. Norway was disheartened to find that the pilot was not more deterred by the flames, but the pilot had been briefed to know what to expect. In a later trial with a pilot who had not been told about the flame weapon, Norway was dismayed to see that he flew with half a wing cutting into the flame. This pilot had worked for a stunt firm, so was used to driving cars "through plates of glass and walls of fire". Despite these discouraging results, the flamethrower was installed on a number of coastal vessels. Although seemingly unable to do any real damage, intelligence sources indicated that the height of attacks went up well above .

The Admiralty also ordered a version of Cockatrice that could be taken from a lorry and mounted on a landing craft to make a landing craft assault (flame thrower) or LCA(FT). The LCA(FT) does not appear to have been used in action. A successor to Cockatrice called Basilisk was designed with improved cross-country performance, for use with armoured car regiments, but it was not adopted and only a prototype was produced.

Ronson 

The first British vehicle mounted flamethrower for regular army use was developed in 1940 by the then newly established PWD. This flamethrower was known as the Ronson after the cigarette lighter manufacturer of the same name known for its stylish and dependable cigarette lighter products. Fraser developed the Ronson from his original Cockatrice prototypes. The Ronson was mounted on a Universal Carrier which was an open topped, lightly armoured tracked vehicle. The Ronson had fuel and compressed gas mounted tanks over the rear of the vehicle. The British Army turned the design down for various reasons but specifically requiring greater range.

Lieutenant-General Andrew McNaughton, commander of Canadian forces in Britain, was an imaginative officer with a keen eye for potential new weapons. He played a significant part in the development of flamethrowers and ordered 1,300 Ronsons on his own initiative. The Canadians eventually developed the Wasp Mk IIC (see below) which became the preferred model. The Ronson was also attached to the Churchill tank. Fraser was told that a tank was preferable to the Universal Carrier as a mount for a flamethrower, because it was very much less vulnerable. A Churchill MkII tank was modified as a prototype by 24 March 1942, it had a pair of Ronson projectors one on either side of the front of the hull, they could not be aimed except by moving the entire vehicle. Fuel was held in a pair of containers projecting from the rear of the vehicle. Major J. M. Oke contributed to the design, including a suggestion that the fuel be held in the reserve fuel tank – a lightly armoured standard fitting available for the Churchill tank. The design was reduced to a single flame projector and became known as the Churchill Oke. Three Churchill Okes were included as part of the tank support for the Dieppe Raid but did not get to use the flamethrowers in combat.

From the Canadians, the Ronson came to the attention of the United States who later developed it use as a replacement for the main gun on obsolete M3A1 tank, a weapon that was called Satan. Later, other models of the M3 Stuart were fitted with similar flamethrowers alongside the main armament. Satan and others would see action in the Pacific War and during Operation Overlord.

Wasp 

In September 1942, this improved appliance was put into production as the Wasp Mk I. An order for 1,000 was placed and all had been delivered by November 1943. The Wasp Mk I had two fuel tanks located inside the carrier's hull and used a large projector gun that was mounted over the top of the carrier. The Mk I was immediately outdated by the development of the Wasp Mk II which had a much handier flame projector mounted at the front on the machine-gun mounting. Although there was no improvement in range, this version performed much better being easier to aim and much safer to use.

The Wasp Mk II went into action during the Invasion of Normandy in July 1944. The Wasps were used mainly in support of infantry operations, whereas the Crocodile was used with armoured formations. They were extremely effective weapons, dreaded by the Germans who had to bear their effects; because of the fear of these flamethrowers, infantry opposition often ceased when they arrived. It was not long before the Wasp Mk IIs were joined by yet another Wasp variant, this one having been developed by the Canadians and denoted Mk IIC. The Canadians had determined that devoting a Universal Carrier exclusively to the flamethrower role was inefficient and they redesigned the Wasp so that the carrier could also function in its normal manner. This was achieved by removing the internal fuel tanks and replacing them with a single tank externally mounted at the back of the vehicle. This allowed room inside for a third crew member who could carry a light machine gun. The Mk IIC was much more tactically flexible and it gradually became the favoured type. In June 1944 all Wasp production was changed to the Mk IIC and existing MK IIs were also adapted to this standard. Experience demonstrated the need for more frontal armour and many Wasp Mk IICs were fitted with plastic armour over the front plates.

Valentine 

George John Rackham, an ex-Tank Corps officer and tank designer who was a bus designer at Associated Equipment Company (AEC), developed a flamethrower that became known as the Heavy Pump Unit. One version consisted of a Worthington Simpson Pump driven by a Rolls-Royce Kestrel engine and another used a Mather and Platt pump powered by a Napier Lion engine. The Heavy Pump Unit was mounted on an AEC 6×6 chassis and there was also a small projector on a two-wheeled carriage that could be towed and then manhandled by the crew as far as the hose would stretch. A demonstration of the Heavy Pump Unit on the lawns around Leeds Castle in Kent were witnessed by the Secretary of State for War, Lord Margesson. Shortly afterwards General Alec Richardson, Director of Armoured Fighting Vehicles and the War Office, saw a similar demonstration and the PWD were soon asked for a similar weapon mounted on a tank.

Work began on two prototypes based on the Valentine tank, both had fuel stored in a trailer but each employed a different system for generating the gas pressure required for the flame projector. This system had a projector mounted in a small sub-turret that allowed the projector to be aimed. This version seems to have been relatively crude, requiring the entire vehicle to be moved to aim the projector. Even so, the PWD system won out in a competitive trial. Its main advantage was that gas pressure was maintained allowing, if required, continuous discharge; whereas, the MoS prototype had to wait between bursts while the cordite built up more gas pressure. The two development teams merged under PWD.

Churchill Crocodile 

The PWD worked on a flamethrower for the Churchill infantry tank. Work was initially slow because priority was given to the Wasp and there is a suggestion that early work on the Crocodile was unofficial. The first prototype was completed early in 1942 and a report by the Royal Armoured Corps stated that the Crocodile was not a requirement of the General Staff but that PWD was hoping that a demonstration in the near future would change minds. The design drew upon experience with the Valentine tank prototypes. The trailer had two wheels fitted with run-flat tyres but no shock absorbers or brakes.

The connection between the trailer and the tank was a substantial piece of engineering, three large joints allowed the tank to move in a wide range of angles relative to the trailer. A micro-switch would activate a warning light in the driver's compartment if the angle of the connection became too large. Flamethrower fuel passed through an armoured hose to a projector mounted instead of the hull machine gun, meaning that the gunner could use the same sight for either weapon. A key requirement was that the normal operation of the tank was not restricted. In the event the original tank design required only very minor changes and it retained its original main armament. The tank's manoeuvrability was inevitably hampered by having a trailer, though this could be detached by a quick-release mechanism triggered by a Bowden cable.

The pressure required had to be primed on the trailer by the crew as close to use as feasible, because pressure could not be maintained for very long. The fuel was used at 4 gallons per second; refuelling took at least 90 minutes and pressurisation around 15 minutes. The fuel burned on water and could be used to set fire to woods and houses. The flamethrower could project a 'wet' burst of unlit fuel which would splash into trenches and though gaps in buildings, bunkers and other strong points, to be ignited with a second 'hot' burst.

In 1943, Percy Hobart saw a Crocodile at Orford; Hobart was in command of the 79th Armoured Division and he was responsible for many of the specialised armoured vehicles ("Hobart's Funnies"), that were to be used in the invasion of Normandy. Hobart buttonholed Sir Graham Cunningham at the Ministry of Supply and agreed a development plan. Alan Brooke (Chief of the Imperial General Staff) added the Crocodile to Hobart's brief. One of Hobart's assistants, Brigadier Yeo put pressure on for the final production and sixty Crocodiles were ready just in time for D–Day.

Pipeline Under the Ocean

Operation Pluto (Pipe-Lines Under The Ocean) was an operation to construct oil pipelines under the English Channel between England and France in support of Operation Overlord – the allied invasion of France.

In April 1942, plans were being drawn up for an allied invasion of France. The proposed landing force would include thousands of vehicles needing a tremendous amount of fuel which would have to be supplied somehow and maintaining a sufficient supply was potentially a serious problem. Geoffrey William Lloyd, the Minister for Petroleum, asked Lord Louis Mountbatten, Chief of Combined Operations, whose area this was, whether there was anything PWD could do to help. Mountbatten replied "Yes, you can lay an oil pipeline across the English Channel". Pipelines were considered necessary to relieve dependence on oil tankers which could be slowed by bad weather, were susceptible to German submarines, and were needed in the Pacific War.

However, laying a pipeline as a part of an invasion presented significant difficulties. The pipe and everything else needed would have to be prepared in great secrecy; pipe laying could not start until the invasion actually took place and would have to be completed quickly enough to be useful. Another reason to work quickly was to avoid bad weather and the worst of the channel's currents.

HAIS 

On 15 April 1942, Arthur Hartley, chief engineer with the Anglo-Iranian Oil Company, attended a meeting of the Overseas Development Committee of the Oil Control Board in place of Sir William Fraser who was unable to attend. Here Hartley saw a chart of the English Channel which piqued his curiosity. Inquiring, Hartley learned about PLUTO and its many difficulties.

Hartley proposed a scheme using adapted underwater power cable developed by Siemens Brothers, (in conjunction with the National Physical Laboratory) was adopted and it became known as the HAIS pipeline. HAIS pipeline consisted of an inner lead tube surrounded by layers of bitumen impregnated paper, cotton and jute yarn and protected by layers of steel tape and galvanised steel wires. The design of HAIS was refined as a result of a series of tests, the main changes being to increase the layers of steel tape armouring from two to four and to manufacture the inner lead pipe using extrusion thereby avoiding a longitudinal seam.

In May 1943, Callenders, a company based in Erith, was engaged to produce HAIS pipeline sections. Production required new machinery and the construction of gantries to transfer the pipe from factory to storage and to load it onto ships.

The HAIS sections had to be joined; the jointing process was a form of welding known as lead burning; the projected  length of pipeline required 75 joints and it was vital that the joints did not fail during the handling and laying or during normal operation. Brothers Frank and Albert Stone were engaged to make the critical joins.

HAIS sections were joined by first trimming the section ends and then positioning them on wooden jigs. The main sealing lead-burn was blended with the metal of the pipe with the brothers using their skills to ensure that there was a complete seal and a smooth exterior surface to ensure that nothing interfered with the armouring process. a slight ridge on the inside of the pipe was inevitable and would not significantly interfere with fuel flow. Each join took about two and half hours to complete after which the pipe would be re-pressurised and armouring would resume.

The Stone brothers worked 18- to 20-hour shifts to keep the armouring machines running. To ensure secrecy, they were instructed not to tell anybody what work they were doing and to remove the Stone company name and Ship and Chemical Plumbers signs from their two-ton Ford truck. The need for secrecy got the brothers into difficulty one night when, returning home, they ran over and killed a dog. They dutifully reported the accident at a nearby police station where a police man became suspicious of their activities because their name was not on their van and because they were very evasive when questioned.
Having lost hours of valuable sleeping time while they were detained, they were released when it was noticed that their petrol ration book had been issued by the PWD.

About  of HAIS pipe were produced in the UK and another  were produced by American companies.

Four ships were converted from their role as merchants to carry and lay HAIS pipeline. These were HMS Latimer and HMS Sancroft at 7,000 tons; and HMS Holdfast and HMS Algerian at 1,500 tons. The larger two of the flotilla could each carry two lengths of HAIS pipeline; sufficient for the  distance to Normandy. The smaller ships could only carry a single length of pipeline and were used to lay the pipes from Kent to the Pas de Calais. A number of Thames barges were equipped to lay pipes in shallow water from the ships to the shore terminals. These same barges also laid short lengths of the relatively flexible HAIS pipe at the landfall ends of the steel HAMEL pipes.

Coupling devices were designed so that lengths of pipe could be joined while at sea, an operation that could be completed in about 20 minutes. The couplings incorporated thin copper disks that would maintain the pressure of water kept in the pipes in order to prevent distortion during handling and laying; the disks were designed to burst when the fuel pumps brought pipes up to the operating pressure.

HAMEL 

An all-steel pipe was also developed; this became known as HAMEL after Henry Alexander Hammick and B.J. Ellis of the Iraq Petroleum Company and Burmah Oil Company respectively. This design was an alternative in case HAIS failed or not enough lead could be obtained for its continued production. HAMEL was a steel tube  in diameter and was similar to onshore pipelines. Hammick and Ellis had noticed the flexibility of long lengths of steel pipe used for onshore pipelines and thought that sections of pipe could be welded together to make a pipe of any desired length. Special welding machines were obtained to make the thousands of strong and reliable joints needed to cross the channel.

Although the steel pipe was flexible, it could not easily be twisted. This meant that it could not be stored as a coil in the hold of a cable laying ship where each turn of the coil would require a 360° twist in the pipe as it was laid. Admiralty Hopper Barge No 24 was fitted out with a large wheel allowing pipe to be wound and unwound without twisting. Renamed HMS Persephone, this ship laid pipes from the British mainland to the Isle of Wight, this served as a trial run and pipes laid provided a vital link in the oil pipeline network.

Persephone, however, could only lay a relatively short length of pipe. Ellis solved this problem with the design of a  floating drum onto which a great length of pipe could be coiled in the manner of thread on a bobbin. This drum could be towed across the channel and the pipe unwound onto the seabed. The mysterious-looking, conical-ended drum was aptly dubbed . Short lengths of pipe were welded together into  sections, as these long sections were welded together the finished pipe was wound onto the floating conundrum. The conundrum's height in the water could be adjusted by varying the amount of ballast water in the drum.

Tests using a powerful tug to tow a conundrum were disappointing even when a second tug was added. Banks, a man with no seamanship skills, suggested that the wake of the tugs engines was pushing the conundrum backwards and impeding movement; separating the two tugs greatly improved performance, and a third small tug was added behind the conundrum to help with steering.

An onshore pipeline system had been established during the war that fed petroleum from tankers berthed at London, Bristol and Merseyside to airfields in Southern England. PLUTO was fed via a spur established to Lepe, a hamlet on the shore of The Solent. From there, a length of HAMEL pipe took fuel under the Solent to a bay near Cowes on the Isle of Wight, through an overland pipe across the island to Shanklin.

Pluto Minor 

The invasion of Normandy began on 6 June 1944. Troops, equipment and vehicles were landed on the beaches and they were soon followed by thousands of jerrycans of fuel. 13,400 tons of fuel were landed this way on Dday itself.

Operation Pluto was scheduled to lay its first pipeline across the channel just 18 days after DDay, but this did not happen. Troops continued to be supported by transporting jerrycans of fuel. As daily fuel consumption rose, ship-to-shore pipelines codenamed TOMBOLA were laid.

Pipe to Cherbourg 

The British planned to establish an undersea pipeline from the Isle of Wight to the French port of Cherbourg as soon as it had been liberated by Allied forces. Pumping stations were established at Shanklin and at Sandown and collectively known by the codename BAMBI. Shanklin was, as it is today, a popular seaside resort at Sandown Bay on the Isle of Wight. At Sandown, the pumps were installed in the old fortifications of the Yaverland Battery. At each location, great care was taken to hide what was going on from the enemy; lorry loads of building materials were hidden as soon as they arrived on site. At Shanklin a  tank was built on a hill and hidden by trees and camouflage netting. Near the shore the pumps were installed in the remains of the Royal Spa Hotel "simulating on a new elevation – twelve feet higher up the debris and wrecked dwelling-rooms – even the contents of the bathrooms, that strewed the ground, and hiding our mechanisms beneath this false floor." From the hotel pump room, pipes ran to the town's pier, along it and down into the sea. At Sandown the activity was hidden by newly seeded grass that had to be watered every day and by carefully brushing out lorry tyre tracks. With everything prepared, there was nothing to do but to wait for Dday.

It had been planned that the first full-length Pluto pipe would be laid on D+18 (that is 18 days after D-day). The plans were delayed because it took longer than expected to capture Cherbourg and when the port was finally taken it was heavily damaged and extensively mined. The first cross channel pipe, a HAIS, was laid on 12 August by HMS Latimer. All went well until, in the final stages, she caught the pipe with her own anchor and wrecked it. Two days later Sancroft laid a pipe: again all went well until the final stage of bringing the pipe ashore when a mishap caused the pipe to be abandoned. The first attempt to lay a HAMEL pipeline was made on 27 August (D+) but had to be abandoned because tons of barnacles had accumulated on one side of the Conundrum. Problems continued with the final stage of connecting HAIS and HAMEL pipes to the shore; the resulting leaks and other difficulties causing the pipes to be abandoned. On 18 September (D+) a HAIS pipe was finally connected and successfully tested; four days later fuel pumping started delivering  every day. On 29 September (D+) a HAMEL pipeline was also successfully connected.

Although sources vary, it seems likely that only one HAIS and one HAMEL pipeline were successfully laid. While their contribution to the war effort was no-doubt welcome, with so many delays Operation Pluto had failed to deliver when it was most needed and with so few successful pipes being connected what it did deliver was a relative trickle compared with the bulk of supplies that were being landed at captured ports. Even partial success did not last long: on 3 October it was decided to increase the pressure of the HAIS pipeline, causing it to fail after a few hours and that same night the HAMEL pipeline also failed. By this time, the allies' circumstances had changed dramatically, the deep water port of Le Havre had been captured and the armies had penetrated deep into France; rather than attempt a repair or replacement of the existing pipelines, attention shifted to the much shorter route across the channel to Calais. Contrary to the upbeat tone of Bank's memoir, this stage of Operation Pluto was little short of failure.

Pipe to Pas de Calais 

A pumping station named DUMBO was established at Dungeness in Kent. This pumping station received oil from west coast ports and from the Isle of Grain oil terminal. The route of the pipeline was chosen to give the enemy the impression that the oil was being sent to the area between Hythe and Folkestone, consistent with an allied invasion at the Pas-de-Calais. Pumps were installed into some of the many seaside homes at Dungeness and the pipes were covered in the shingle of which the headland is largely composed.

The first connection attempted was a HAIS pipe which was laid on 10 October. Vital lessons had been learned from earlier experience and the difficulties in making the shore connections were overcome. However, worsening weather and waning official enthusiasm dampened progress. Fuel pumping was delayed until 27 October and by December only four HAIS pipe were working and these had to run at a relatively low pressure resulting in daily delivery of just 700 tons of fuel. Despite official doubts, PLUTO continued. HAMEL pipe was more difficult to bring ashore and especially so in poor weather; the problem was solved by adding lengths of HAIS pipe onto the ends of a HAMEL pipeline as it was wound onto a conundrum greatly simplifying shore connection.

Seventeen pipelines were laid from Dungeness to Boulogne of which up to 11 were working until the end of the war. The pipelines were not designed to last long, the steel HAMEL pipes generally succumbed to friction with the sea bed within a few weeks and the HAIS pipes lasted only a little longer.

Pluto was blighted by the bad luck such as the delays capturing Cherbourg and an inability to translate the results of trials into reality quickly enough to keep up with the fighting. Things could have turned out differently and nothing should be allowed to subtract from the impressive technical achievement under very difficult circumstances.

"In retrospect, it seems clear that PLUTO's advocates had been far too sanguine. They had assumed that it would be possible for the naval laying units to achieve immediately the degree of technical proficiency attained by the technically expert laying parties in the trials conducted in 1943 under the supervision of those who had designed the equipment; and that what could be done in the Bristol Channel and the Solent could be done in wartime operational conditions on the much longer lay across the Channel"

Recovery 

PLUTO ceased operation in July 1945, just a few months after the end of fighting in Europe. Because the pipes were a hazard to shipping, the Royal Navy cut the pipe and removed sections that were just a few miles offshore. Starting in August 1946, the former HMS Latimer was used in a private salvage operation. The first part of the operation used a grapple to find a pipeline and haul it up and onto the ship's bow.

HAIS was found to be in good condition and its high lead content made salvage particularly valuable; each pipe could be cut just once and then coiled in the ship's hold. Lengths of HAIS pipes were cleared of petrol and cut into lengths suitable for transportation by rail. These short lengths were sent to Swansea where the recovered lead was melted and cast into ingots; the wires were straightened and used as rebars; the steel tapes were flatted and used to make corner reinforcements for heavy duty cardboard boxes; and the jute was made into blocks that could be burned as fuel in a furnace.

The HAMEL pipes were also valuable, but being less flexible, needed to be cut into lengths on the deck of the recovery ship. Cutting either type of pipeline was very dangerous because the pipes still contained petrol.

The salvage operation lasted three years. Of the 25,000 tons of lead and steel originally used, 22,000 tons were recovered.

Fog Investigation and Dispersal Operation 

From the beginning of the war it became evident that many aircraft were being lost in accidents during landing in unfavourable weather. Fog was a particularly serious hazard, settling unpredictably over airfields where tired, possibly injured, pilots in aeroplanes short of fuel and in some cases damaged, had to land. The night of 16/17 October 1940 was particularly unfortunate. In raids by 73 bombers three aircraft were shot down but ten crashed on landing. When this was brought to the attention of Prime Minister Churchill he demanded that something be done: "... It ought to be possible to guide them down quite safely as commercial craft were before the war in spite of fog. Let me have full particulars. The accidents last night are very serious"

Previously Professor David Brunt of Imperial College London had calculated that if the temperature of a volume of fog were raised by about  it would evaporate. Some preliminary experiments had been conducted between 1936 and 1939 using burners based on agricultural sprayers and a fuel that was a mixture of petrol and alcohol. Although the heat generated was not sufficient to clear a substantial volume of fog, the feasibility of the method was established. However, no further development took place.

As the bomber offensive grew in scale, more aircraft flew ever greater distances and more accidents followed. Despite Churchill's injunction, no measures being taken to reduce the losses caused by bad weather. Eventually, in September 1941 Charles Portal, Chief of the Air Staff and Lord Cherwell, Churchill's scientific advisor, recommended that the pre-war fog dispersal work should be resumed. However, the idea met with resistance and Cherwell later reluctantly recommended postponement.

By September 1942 it was realised that not only were many aircraft being unnecessarily lost but that sustained operations were being limited by considerations of the weather. Secretary of State for Air, Archibald Sinclair recommended that PWD undertake fog dispersal trials. Within 24 hours, a personal minute was on Geoffrey Lloyd's desk: "It is of the greatest importance to find a means to dissipate fog at aerodromes so that aircraft can land safely. Let full experiments to this end be put in hand by the Petroleum Warfare Department with all expedition. They should be given every possible support. W.S.C."

Lloyd, Banks, Hartley (chief engineer of the Anglo-Iranian Oil Company), and Edward George Walker a civil and aeronautical engineer, and others, met. Lloyd visited fruit farmers who used Smudge pot heaters to protect their crops; Hartley arranged for a part of the King George VI Reservoir that had been left empty for the duration of the war to be used for experiments; and Walker took to long walks on foggy nights wearing a government issue donkey jacket – much to the puzzlement of his family. Experiments were quickly put in hand with large scale tests taking place in the reservoir and smaller scale tests in a disused indoor ice rink at Earls Court where a wind tunnel was set up so that a wide range of weather conditions could be simulated.

In some of the earliest experiments, Wasp flame throwers were used. A Cockatrice in thick fog fired six  second busts which cleared the air in its immediate vicinity.

The first purpose designed burner was known as Four-Oaks used a mixture of petrol and alcohol, but it was not possible to obtain a smokeless flame. A fireman went up an escape ladder borrowed for the experiments and he disappeared into the gloom after climbing just a few rungs. As the burners got going he reappeared at the top of the  ladder only to disappear again when the burners were turned off. Unfortunately, the Four-Oaks burner produced as much smoke as it cleared fog and did not produce a really satisfactory degree of heating. Experiments with coke burners worked better, at least initially, but they could not be controlled and caused smoke and other problems.

A new burner called Haigas (later known as the Mark I) was developed. Haigas used petrol which was preheated to form a vapour before it was burnt, thereby significantly increasing efficiency and reducing smoke. An experimental system was installed at Graveley, Cambridgeshire and was tested for the first time on 18 February 1943 in poor visibility, although not thick fog. The pilot, Air commodore Don Bennett, commander of the RAF Pathfinder Force, said "I had vague thoughts of seeing lions jumping through a hoop of flames at the circus. The glare was certainly considerable and there was some runway turbulence, but it was nothing to worry about." Graveley became the first operational FIDO site and the system was rapidly expanded.

The pipes ran back and forth in close proximity along the burner's length. After traversing the length of the burner three times, the petrol flowed into the fourth length of pipe: a burner pipe that was pierced with holes. The circuitous route of the fuel allowed it to be heated and vaporised by the heat of burners, this was done so that it would burn efficiently and without producing significant amounts of smoke.

Later burner designs called the Haigill system and designated Mark II to Mark VI were simpler and more efficient, requiring only three lengths of pipe. Earlier versions of Haigill used two runs of evaporator pipe and one burner pipe, later versions used one run of evaporator pipe and two burner pipes.

Later still, the Hairpin burner was developed, it had one length of evaporator pipe immediately above one length of burner pipe. Hairpin was set in a specially shaped cast-iron trough in a heat-resistant concrete trench that was then covered in a grid of steel bars at ground level. This design did not generate any more heat than the earlier versions, but was much less intrusive upon air operations. Yet more sophisticated designs followed along similar lines.

The value of FIDO is difficult to estimate. Approximately 700 aircraft landed with FIDO operating in foggy conditions and about 2,000 landed with FIDO being used allowing the runway to be identified in conditions of limited visibility. Some 3,500 aircrew owe their lives to FIDO and for perhaps 10,000 others a serious situation made easier. The FIDO system was briefly used commercially. It was intended to be used at London Heathrow Airport and small sections were put in place. However, advances in various landing systems made FIDO redundant.

Legacy 

When the war in Europe was nearly won, the activities of the Petroleum Warfare Department were widely publicised as being demonstrative of British ingenuity. Newsreels told the British public how flamethrower weapons had been developed to defend the country against invasion and how the PLUTO and FIDO projects had helped win the war.

The Petroleum Warfare Department planned a travelling exhibition of its achievements; the end of hostilities caused a change of plan: a temporary exhibition at the otherwise closed Imperial War Museum. From October 1945 to January 1946 the general public was invited to view details of flame throwing weapons, the FIDO system and PLUTO. The exhibition was viewed by more than 20,000 people. Donald Banks published his account of the activities of the PWD in Flame Over Britain.

Engineer-turned-author Nevil Shute joined the Royal Naval Volunteer Reserve as a sub-lieutenant and soon ended up in what would become the Directorate of Miscellaneous Weapons Development. Drawing on his experience, he wrote Most Secret, a novel about a converted fishing vessel equipped with a cockatrice-like weapon. The book was written in 1942, but its publication was held back by the censor until 1945.

There is a PLUTO pump on display at the Bembridge Heritage Centre and at the Isle of Wight Zoo at Sandown. There is a book Where PLUTO Crossed the Path that describes where the public can trace markers on the pipeline route on the Isle of Wight.

See also 
 British anti-invasion preparations of World War II
 British hardened field defences of World War II

Notes

Footnotes

Bibliography

Books
 
 
 
 
 
 
 
 
 
 
 
  – walks on the Isle of Wight near PLUTO pipes.
 
 
 
 
 
 
 
 
 
 
 
 
 
 
 
 
 
 
 
 
 
 
 
 
 
 
 
 

Hansard
 

Unattributed sources
 
 
 
 

 
 
 
 

War Office documents
 
 

Pathé News
 
  – Burning seas (from start), flame barrage (from 2:10), hedge hopper (from 3:28), fougasse (from 3:59), Cockatrice (from 4:32). Note that the narrator gives an exaggerated account and repeats some propaganda as fact.
 
 

Imperial War Museum documents
  – a manuscript detailing Captain Newton's work, written by his nephew.
  – blueprint.
 
 
 

National Archive documents
 
 
 
 
 
 
 
  Facsimile of: CAB 101/131, The National Archives.</ref>

Further reading

External links 
 
 
 
 

Defunct departments of the Government of the United Kingdom
History of the petroleum industry in the United Kingdom
Military history of the United Kingdom during World War II
Petroleum organizations
World War II weapons of the United Kingdom
1940 establishments in the United Kingdom
1940 in the United Kingdom